Rosing can refer to:

People
 Astrid Rosing Sawyer, Danish-born Chicago businesswoman, translator
 Bodil Rosing, actress
Boris Rosing, engineer, inventor
 Emilie Rosing
 Hans-Rudolf Rösing, German U-boat commander
 Johanne Rosing
 Linda Rosing, Swedish model
 Michael Rosing (actor)
 Tajana Rosing, American computer scientist and computer engineer
 Val Rosing, singer, son of Vladimir Rosing
 Vladimir Rosing, Russian opera singer and director, father of Val Rosing
 Wayne Rosing, computer scientist

Places
 Rosing Township, Minnesota